Aegires is a genus of sea slugs, dorid nudibranchs, marine gastropod mollusks in the family Aegiridae. Species within this genus feed exclusively on calcareous sponges.

Aegires is the type genus of the family Aegiridae.

Species
Species in the genus Aegires include:
 Aegires absalaoi Garcia, Troncoso & Dominguez, 2002
 Aegires acauda Ortea, Moro & Espinosa, 2015
Aegires albopunctatus MacFarland, 1905
Aegires albus Thiele, 1912
Aegires citrinus Pruvot-Fol, 1930
 Aegires corrugatus Ortea, Moro & Espinosa, 2015
 Aegires evorae Moro & Ortea, 2015
Aegires exeches Fahey & Gosliner, 2004
Aegires flores Fahey & Gosliner, 2004
Aegires gomezi Ortea, Luque & Templado, 1990
 Aegires gracilis Ortea, Moro & Espinosa, 2015
Aegires hapsis Fahey & Gosliner, 2004
 Aegires incisus (G.O. Sars, 1872)
Aegires incusus Fahey & Gosliner, 2004
 Aegires lagrifaensis Ortea, Moro & Espinosa, 2015
Aegires lemoncello Fahey & Gosliner, 2004
Aegires leuckartii Vérany, 1853
Aegires malinus Fahey & Gosliner, 2004
Aegires ninguis Fahey & Gosliner, 2004
 Aegires ochum Ortea, Espinosa & Caballer, 2013
Aegires ortizi Templado, Luque & Ortea, 1987
Aegires palensis Ortea, Luque & Templado, 1990
Aegires petalis Fahey & Gosliner, 2004
Aegires punctilucens (d'Orbigny, 1837) - type species of Aegires
Aegires sublaevis Odhner, 1932
Aegires villosus Farran, 1905
Species brought into synonymy
 Aegires citrinus (Bergh, 1875): synonym of Notodoris citrina Bergh, 1875
 Aegires gardineri (Eliot, 1906): synonym of Notodoris gardineri Eliot, 1906
 Aegires hispidus Hesse, 1872: synonym of Aegires punctilucens (d'Orbigny, 1837)
 Aegires leuckarti [sic]: synonym of Aegires leuckartii Vérany, 1853
 Aegires minor (Eliot, 1904): synonym of Notodoris minor Eliot, 1904
 Aegires protectus Odhner, 1934: synonym of Aegires albus Thiele, 1912
 Aegires pruvotfolae Fahey & Gosliner, 2004: synonym of Aegires citrinus Pruvot-Fol, 1930
 Aegires serenae (Gosliner & Behrens, 1997): synonym of Notodoris serenae Gosliner & Behrens, 1997

References

External links
 Lovén S. (1844). Om nordiska hafs-mollusker. Öfversigt af Kungliga Vetenskaps-Akademiens Förhandlingar, Stockholm 1(3): 48-53. German translation in: Archiv Skandinavischer Beiträge zur Naturgeschichte (Greifswald) 1: 151-156.

Aegiridae